was a Japanese wrestler. He competed in the men's Greco-Roman lightweight at the 1964 Summer Olympics.

References

External links

1941 births
2011 deaths
Japanese male sport wrestlers
Olympic wrestlers of Japan
Wrestlers at the 1964 Summer Olympics
Place of birth missing
Asian Games medalists in wrestling
Wrestlers at the 1962 Asian Games
Asian Games gold medalists for Japan
Medalists at the 1962 Asian Games
20th-century Japanese people
21st-century Japanese people